Jeff Fowler is an American filmmaker, animator, storyboard artist, and visual effects artist. He was nominated for the Academy Award for Best Animated Short Film as writer and director of the short animated film Gopher Broke (2004). He made his theatrical directorial debut with the live-action adaptation of Sonic the Hedgehog (2020), and returned to direct the 2022 sequel.

Career
Fowler served as an animator for the 2003 short film Rockfish and the 2009 film Where the Wild Things Are. He only served as an actor once in Gilmore Girls, voicing Bob as a minor role in the episode Eight O'Clock at the Oasis. In 2004, he wrote, directed, storyboarded, laid out the art, and animated Gopher Broke. He also wrote and animated A Gentleman's Duel.

Fowler worked on the CGI movie production for the 2005 video game Shadow the Hedgehog. He would later go on to direct Sonic the Hedgehog, a film based on the video game franchise of the same name. The film was originally set to release in November 2019, but due to widespread criticism toward Sonic's design, it was delayed to February 14, 2020 to change the design. The new design for Sonic was revealed in November 2019, garnering far more positive responses from fans and critics.

Fowler directed a sequel to Sonic the Hedgehog titled Sonic the Hedgehog 2, which released on April 8, 2022. He is set to direct a reboot of The Pink Panther, which is in development.

Filmography
Film

Short films

Television

Video games

References

External links 
 
 Rotten Tomatoes

American film directors
American film producers
American male screenwriters
American storyboard artists
Living people
Visual effects artists
Ringling College of Art and Design alumni
Year of birth missing (living people)